The Woman One Longs For (German: Die Frau, nach der man sich sehnt) is a 1929 German silent drama film directed by Curtis Bernhardt and starring Marlene Dietrich, Fritz Kortner and Frida Richard. It was based on the novel of the same title by Max Brod, published in Vienna by Paul Zsolnay Verlag in 1927. Made partly at the Babelsberg Studios and the Terra Studios, the film premiered on 29 April 1929 at the Mozartsaal in Berlin. The film's art direction was by Robert Neppach. It is also known by the alternative title The Three Lovers.

The film was originally silent with a scored orchestra accompaniment by Giuseppe Becce. In 1931 a synchronised soundtrack was added with music by Edward Kilenyi.

Cast
 Marlene Dietrich as Stascha 
 Fritz Kortner as Dr. Karoff 
 Frida Richard as Mme. Leblanc 
 Oskar Sima as Charles Leblanc 
 Uno Henning as Henry Leblanc 
 Karl Etlinger as Poitrier 
 Bruno Ziener as Diener 
 Edith Edwards as Angela Poitrier

References

Bibliography
 Bach, Steven. Marlene Dietrich: Life and Legend. University of Minnesota Press, 2011.
 Kreimeier, Klaus. The Ufa Story: A History of Germany's Greatest Film Company, 1918-1945. University of California Press, 1999.
 Spoto, Donald. Blue Angel: The Life of Marlene Dietrich. Rowman & Littlefield, 2000.

External links

1929 films
1929 drama films
German drama films
Films of the Weimar Republic
German silent feature films
Films directed by Curtis Bernhardt
Terra Film films
German black-and-white films
Films shot at Babelsberg Studios
Films shot at Terra Studios
Silent drama films
1920s German films
1920s German-language films